Red Guy may refer to:

 Red Guy, a character in British web series Don't Hug Me I'm Scared
 The Red Guy, a character in American animated series Cow and Chicken